Fotbal Club Astra II, commonly known as Astra II Ploiești, Astra II Giurgiu, or simply as Astra II, is the reserve squad of Romanian second league side, Astra Giurgiu. The team was founded in 2013 to serve as a "launch pad" to the first team, for the young players from the club's youth center.

History

The first Astra II
The history of Astra's satellite started in fact before 2013, more exactly in 2010, when Ioan Niculae the owner of Astra Giurgiu (at that time Astra Ploiești) bought Dunărea Giurgiu, club founded in 1963 and member of the Liga II at that time. After the transaction, Dunărea was renamed as Astra II Giurgiu becoming the reserve squad of Astra Ploiești. In the summer of 2012 the club was dissolved after the owner decided to cut back on expense, then the first Astra II was re-founded in the summer of 2013 as Dunărea Giurgiu, the original name of the club.

Ploiești-Giurgiu route
In September 2012, the first team was moved from Ploiești to Giurgiu and renamed as Astra Giurgiu.

One year later appeared again the idea of a second team, which was founded in the summer of 2013 as FC Astra II. The move of the first team was only for the official matches, the youth academy and the training were still conducted in Ploiești, such that the new reserve team established its camp at Ciorani, Prahova County, 40 km away from Ploiești. Astra II Ciorani, as it was commonly known at that time, promoted to Liga III at the end of the 2013–14 Liga IV season, after winning the Prahova County series and also the promotion play-off match against FC Aninoasa, the winners of Dâmbovița County series.

After the promotion Astra II moved to Ploiești, on the Astra Stadium and started to be known as Astra II Ploiești, even if in some situations media refers to the team, as Astra II Giurgiu, due to name of the mother club, Astra Giurgiu. In the Liga III Astra II finished last in the first season and relegated. After one season in the Liga IV, where it finished 9th of 16, Astra II entered back in the Liga III at the start of the 2016–17 Liga III season, taking advantage of the new rule through which the first league teams could enroll their reserve squads directly in the third tier. Further, with managers such as: Constantin Schumacher, Marius Măldărășanu or Adrian Senin, Astra II obtained comfortable results: 10th (2016–17) and 4th (2017–18).

During the 2017–18 season, Astra II had the opportunity to bring back to life the Ploiești derby, against Petrolul Ploiești. The matches ended with two draws, 0–0 on Ilie Oană Stadium and 2–2 on Astra Stadium.

Grounds

Stadionul Marin Anastasovici
In 2010, when the first reserve squad was founded, it played the home matches on Marin Anastasovici Stadium in Giurgiu, Giurgiu County. From 2012 on this stadium plays its home matches the first squad of the football club, Astra Giurgiu.

Stadionul Ionuț Trandafir
In 2013, after the re-foundation, in the current format, Astra II started to play its home matches on Ionuț Trandafir Stadium in Ciorani, Prahova County, with a capacity of 1,500 seats.

Stadionul Astra
In 2014 after the promotion to Liga III, Astra II moved its home matches on Astra Stadium in Ploiești, Prahova County, the former stadium of the mother club, Astra Giurgiu. Astra Stadium has a capacity of 9,000 seats and is still used also by the first squad for training.

Stadionul Conpet
In the autumn of 2018, Astra II started to play some home matches on Conpet Stadium in Strejnicu, with a capacity of 1,732 seats.

Honours

Leagues
Liga IV – Prahova County
Winners (1): 2013–14

Cups
Cupa României – Prahova County
Winners (1): 2013–14

Players

Second team squad

Out on loan

Club officials

Management

 Last updated: 15 March 2020
 Source:

Current technical staff

 Last updated: 15 March 2020
 Source:

League history

References

External links
 Official website 
 
 FC Astra II at frf-ajf.ro

FC Astra Giurgiu
Football clubs in Prahova County
Sport in Ploiești
Association football clubs established in 2013
Liga III clubs
Liga IV clubs
2013 establishments in Romania